Forkhead box protein E3 (FOXE3) also known as forkhead-related transcription factor 8 (FREAC-8) is a protein that in humans is encoded by the FOXE3 gene located on the short arm of chromosome 1.

Function 

FOXE3 is a forkhead-box transcription factor which is involved in the proper formation of the ocular lens and is post-natally expressed in the lens epithelium.

Development 

Foxe3, also known as Forkhead Box E3, is a transcription factor that is responsible for the formation of the lens placode, a precursor to the lens of the eye, and the lens itself.  Foxe3 controls multiple processes during development of the lens including, the expression of Cryaα which controls the solubility of the crystalline protein complex in the developing lens. Reduced solubility can lead to potential cataract formation due to crystallization of the lens. Foxe3 also controls the regulation of Prox1, which is responsible for cell cycle progression. As Foxe3 expression downregulates, Prox1 expression increases causing a reduction in cellular proliferation in the anterior lens. Foxe3 also regulates platelet-derived growth factor receptor-α (Pdgfrα) expression. This is responsible for lens fiber differentiation within the epithelium of certain parts of the lens. There are multiple defects associated with dysfunction of this gene with most being classified under the term anterior segment dysgenesis (ASD). For example, Peters anomaly is a rare disorder obtained during development characterized by adhesions due to malformations of the posterior corneal stroma, the absence of Descemet's membrane and the corneal endothelium, and corneal opacities. This syndrome can be attributed to fetal alcohol syndrome and aneuploidy. Scientists have generated a knockout model for Foxe3 in mice and are testing the effects on the lenses of those animals. So far, it appears that Foxe3 is essential for normal lens development.

Clinical significance 

Mutations in the FOXE3 gene are  associated with anterior segment mesenchymal dysgenesis.

Homozygous mutations in this gene have been associated with a number of ocular diseases such as congenital aphakia, sclerocornea, microphthalmia, and optic disc coloboma.  There have also been reports of heterozygous mutations causing less severe ocular diseases such as anterior segment dysgenesis (sometimes referred to as anterior segment mesenchymal dysgenesis), and Peter's anomaly.

See also
 FOX proteins

References

Further reading

Forkhead transcription factors